Plagiobothrys nothofulvus is a species of flowering plant in the family Boraginaceae known by the common names rusty popcornflower and foothill snowdrops. It is native to western North America from Washington, and California, to northern Mexico.  It is a spring wildflower in grassy meadows, woodlands, coastal sage scrub, and wetland-riparian habitats.

Description
It is an annual herb growing erect 20 to 70 centimeters in maximum height. It contains purple sap, the herbage edged with purple or rusty red and bleeding purple when crushed. It is hairy in texture, the hairs rough and sharp. The leaves are mostly located in a rosette around the base of the stem, with a few alternately arranged along the stem's length. The inflorescence is a series of tiny five-lobed white flowers each 3 to 9 millimeters wide. The fruit is a rounded nutlet with a pointed tip about 2 millimeters long and borne singly, in pairs or triplets which are solidly attached to each other.  Deep roots are characteristic especially on drier soils.

Distribution
Plagiobothrys nothofulvus is native to parts of the Pacific Northwest.  It ranges from northern California and into southern Washington.  Populations have been reported as far south as Baja California, Mexico and north to the Columbia River Gorge.

Habitat
Grassy meadows, especially those along the coast, are the most common habitat for Plagiobothrys nothofulvus.  It can also be found in woodlands, coastal sage scrub, and wetland-riparian habitats and are often associated with serpentine or plutonic soils.  Other species that commonly grow in similar grassland habitats and are often associated with Plagiobothrys nothofulvus include Aster chilensis, Lotus angustissimus, Plantago lanceolata, Galium parisiense, Brodiaea terrestris, and other native herbs.

Etymology
The scientific name of the rusty popcorn flower, Plagiobothrys nothofulvus, describes some of its key characteristics.  Plagiobothrys refers to a sideways pit formed by the position of the nutlet attachment scar.  Nothofulvus comes from the words nothus, meaning bastard or false, and fulvus, meaning yellowish, as it had been at first been mistaken for Plagiobothrys fulvus, which had in turn been named for the dense tawny hairs on its calyx and pedicel.

Ecology
Plagiobothrys nothofulvus is food for many different animals.  Deer, ground squirrels, and insects often forage for the plant.  Turtles will also feed on the flowers in riparian zones.  Black seed-harvesting ants will eat the seeds of popcorn flowers.  Species of beetles will use the flower as a breeding platform.  Butterflies, moths, and bees drink its nectar as they pollinate the flowers.  Ctenuchid moths are frequently found on the flowers, the importance of their interactions is currently unknown.

Reproduction
The flowers of Plagiobothrys nothofulvus generally bloom from February – April. As in many other members of the family Boraginaceae, the flower consists of five petals and are bisexual with both male and female parts represented in the flower. Bees and butterflies are the main pollinators transferring the haploid microgametophyte, or pollen grain, to the pistil.  The microgametophyte will then travel down the pistil to the ovule to fertilize the haploid macrogametophyte, or egg.  Each pollen grain contains two sperm cells for double fertilization of the egg.  One fertilization event forms a diploid zygote and the other fertilization event forms the endosperm of the seed.

Conservation
Plagiobothrys nothofulvus is a federally listed endangered species in Oregon.  The major threat to Plagiobothry nothofulvus is habitat loss by the transformation of its historical range to agricultural land.  The loss of seasonal wetlands by habitat degradation and changing climate as well as the introduction of invasive species also pose large threats to the rusty popcorn flower.  Efforts to restore the population include establishing protected populations, saving seeds, providing education to land owners, and restoring natural habitats.

References

Brown, M. and Human, K. (1997). Effects of harvester ants on plant species distribution and abundance in a serpentine grassland. Oecologia 112 (2) p. 237-243. Retrieved May 28, 2015.

Calflora: Information on California plants for education, research and conservation, with data contributed by public and private institutions and individuals, including the Consortium of California Herbaria. [web application]. 2015. Berkeley, California: The Calflora Database [a non-profit organization]. Available: https://web.archive.org/web/20181117025044/http://calflora.org/   (Accessed: May 28, 2015).

Evens, J. San, S. and Taylor, J. (2004). Vegetation classification and mapping of Peoria Wildlife Area, south of New Melones Lake, Tuolumne County, California. California Native Plant Society. Retrieved May 28, 2015.

Holmes, T. (1990). Botanical trends in northern California oak woodland. Rangelands Society for Range Management 12 (1) p. 3-7. Retrieved May 28, 2015.

Kennedy, K. and Burchfield, H. (2007).  Plagiobothry nothofulvus BIO 203.  University of Wisconsin La Crosse. Retrieved May 28, 2015.

Turner, M. (2013). Plagiobothrys nothofulvus. Turner Photographics. Retrieved May 28, 2015.

U.S. Fish and Wildlife Service. (November 2002). Draft Recovery Plan for the Rough Popcorn Flower (Plagiobothrys hirtus). U.S. Fish and Wildlife Service Portland, Oregon. Retrieved May 28, 2015.

Cary, R. (2006). Popcorn Flower (Plagiobothrys nothofulvus). Yosemite National Park. Retrieved May 28, 2015.

Gray, Asa. (1881) Proceedings of the American Academy of Arts and Sciences 17 new series :227. 

Hooker, W.J. & Arnott, G.A.W.. (1838)The Botany of Captain Beechey's Voyage. (1830) page 38.

External links
Jepson Manual Treatment
Photo gallery

nothofulvus
Flora of Northwestern Mexico
Flora of the Western United States
Flora of California
Flora of Oregon
Flora of Washington (state)
Flora without expected TNC conservation status